Øivind Lunde (born 7 August 1962 in Bergen, Norway) is a Norwegian bass guitarist, known from bands like Elle Melle, Good Time Charly and Electric Heavyland.

Biography 
Lunde started his musical career as a pupil at the Rudolf Steiner School in Bergen. He later started playing the bass guitar in local bands. His first major project was Good Time Charly. They performed at the 1988 URIJAZZ. At the 1993 Nattjazz he was in the lineup for Ole Thomsen's Electric Heavyland, and with Stein Hauge Band (2001–04).

Lunde was also in the backing band for the NRK TV show "Kvinner på randen" for years, also performing live in Norway.

Discography 

2000: Knuste Speil (Tylden & Co.)

References

External links 
Kvinner på randen.. – Gull.VOB on YouTube

Norwegian bass guitarists
Norwegian male bass guitarists
Musicians from Bergen
1962 births
Living people